Nemanja Motika (born 20 March 2003) is a professional footballer who plays as a winger or forward for Austria Lustenau on loan from Red Star Belgrade. Born in Germany and a former German youth international, he now represents Serbia at youth level.

Club career

Bayern Munich II
Motika made his professional debut for Bayern Munich II in the 3. Liga on 9 May 2021, coming on as a substitute in the 68th minute for Rémy Vita against SpVgg Unterhaching. Four minutes later, he scored his first goal for the club, halving Bayern's deficit to 2–1. The home match finished as a loss with no further goals scored.

Red Star Belgrade
After very good half season at Bayern Munich II, where he scored 15 goals and 8 assists for the Martín Demichelis' team, Motika came into the spotlight of big clubs as well as Bayern Munich senior team, for which he was subsequently called up to Julian Nagelsmann's squad for the first match in 2022 against Borussia Monchengladbach, but ultimately he did not enter the game. 

During the winter transfer window, he was the target of both Hamburger SV and Fiorentina among others, but Red Star Belgrade was the most persistent and fastest managing to attract the player's interest. He has been a big fan of the club since he was a child, and his brother Nikola also joined him at the club.

On February 2, 2022 Motika signed a four-year contract with the club and took the number 17 on the advice of fellow German footballer Marko Marin. The transfer fee is potentially worth around €2m, including a future buy-back option clause in favor of Bayern Munich.

International career
Motika played one match for the Germany national under-16 team in September 2018 against Cyprus. In November 2020, he was called up to train with the Serbia national under-19 team.

Career statistics

Club

Honours

Club
Red Star Belgrade
 Serbian SuperLiga: 2021–22
 Serbian Cup: 2021–22

Personal life
Motika was born in Berlin, and is of Serbian descent. His father hails from the Nišići plateau near Sarajevo, and his mother hails from Vranje.

References

External links
 
 
 

2003 births
Living people
Footballers from Berlin
German footballers
Germany youth international footballers
Serbia youth international footballers
Serbian footballers
German people of Serbian descent
German people of Bosnia and Herzegovina descent
Association football forwards
FC Bayern Munich II players
3. Liga players
Serbian people of German descent
Serbian people of Bosnia and Herzegovina descent
Serbia under-21 international footballers